Juga silicula, common name glassy juga, is a small, freshwater snail found lotic water in Washington, Oregon, and northern California. It is dark reddish-brown in color with an ovate operculum and about 3.5 whorls.

Historically, J. silicula was abundant in its range.  It is currently considered a species of concern in Washington due to limited range, habitat degradation and anthropogenic factors. 

J. silicula acts as a first intermediate host for the trematode parasite Cephalouterina dicamptodoni.

References 

Semisulcospiridae
Gastropods described in 1847